Grahame Thomas Smith  (born 8 January 1959) is a Scottish former trade unionist, who served as General Secretary of the Scottish Trades Union Congress (STUC).

Education
Smith attended Bishopbriggs High School, which merged into Bishopbriggs Academy, between 1971 and 1977. He is a graduate of Strathclyde University, where he obtained an Honours Degree in Economics and Industrial Relations.

References

External links
Address by Grahame Smith, STUC, 9 July 2009.
STUC webpage

1959 births
Living people
People educated at Bishopbriggs High School
Alumni of the University of Strathclyde
General Secretaries of the Scottish Trades Union Congress
Commanders of the Order of the British Empire